Hunter Johnson may refer to:
Hunter Johnson (choreographer), ballroom dancer and choreographer
Hunter Johnson (composer) (1906–1998), American composer
J. Hunter Johnson (born 1969), author of GURPS Monsters
Hunter Johnson (American football), American football player
Hunter Johnson (actress), actress who appeared as Zoe on Love for Rent
Hunter Johnson (tennis), American tennis player
Hunter Johnson, actor and director of films including 2 Jennifer

See also
Hunter Johnston or Delirious (born 1981), American professional wrestler